
Year 78 BC was a year of the pre-Julian Roman calendar. At the time it was known as the Year of the Consulship of Lepidus and Catulus. Later and less frequently, it was known as the year 676 AUC). The denomination 78 BC for this year has been used since the early medieval period, when the Anno Domini calendar era became the prevalent method in Europe for naming years.

Events 
 By place 

 Roman Republic 
 In Rome, Marcus Aemilius Lepidus becomes consul. He attempts to undermine the Sullan reforms, quarrels with his consular colleague, is sent to govern Transalpine Gaul, and initiates a rebellion against the Senate with his army there.
 The Senate sends Publius Servilius Vatia to Cilicia as governor, where he fights a successful campaign against the Piracy in southern Anatolia (Lycia, Pamphylia and Isauria), he is thereafter known by the agnomen Isauricus.
 The Tabularium is built in the Forum.
 The Third Dalmatian war begins.

Births 
 Jing Fang, Chinese mathematician and music theorist (d. 37 BC)

Deaths 
 Lucius Cornelius Sulla, Roman general and statesman (b. 138 BC)

References